Clonloghan is a civil parish of County Clare, Ireland, located  by road northwest of Limerick, just north of Shannon.

Geography
The civil parish of Clonloghan lies in the barony of Bunratty Lower.
It is in the southern part of the county and is bordered by Kilnasoolagh to the northwest, Tomfinlough to the northeast, Drumline to the east, Kilmaleery to the west and Kilconry to the southwest. It is divided into 14 townlands:
  

Ballinooskny
Ballymurtagh
Caherteige
Clonloghan
Drumgeely
Killulla 	
Knockaun 	
Leamaneigh Beg 	
Leamaneigh More  
Lisconor
Lislea 
Lismacleane 
Tullyglass 
Tullyvarraga

References

Civil parishes of County Clare